Within the Law is a 1939 American (Precursor) Film noir crime film directed by Gustav Machatý and written by Charles Lederer and Edith Fitzgerald. The film stars Ruth Hussey, Tom Neal, Paul Kelly, William Gargan, Paul Cavanagh and Rita Johnson. The film was released on March 17, 1939, by Metro-Goldwyn-Mayer.

The film is based on the play Within the Law by Bayard Veiller.

Plot
Mary Turner gets arrested for a robbery she didn't commit, while in prison she studies law. After being released, she partners with another woman in order to legally scam wealthy men.

Cast 
Ruth Hussey as Mary Turner
Tom Neal as Richard Gilder
Paul Kelly as Joe Garson
William Gargan as Cassidy
Paul Cavanagh as English Eddie
Rita Johnson as Agnes
Samuel S. Hinds as Mr. Gilder
Lynne Carver as June
Sidney Blackmer as George Demarest
Jo Ann Sayers as Helen Morris
Ann Morriss as Saleswoman
James Burke as 'Red'
Don Douglas as Inspector Burke
Cliff Clark as McGuire
Claude King as Art Dealer
Frank Orth as Jim Jenks

References

External links 
 

1939 films
American crime films
1939 crime films
Metro-Goldwyn-Mayer films
Films directed by Gustav Machatý
Films with screenplays by Charles Lederer
American black-and-white films
American films based on plays
1930s English-language films
1930s American films